Gity Razaz (born March 22, 1986) is an American composer of Iranian origin. She has written music for symphony orchestra, opera, ballet, chamber ensemble, and solo instrumentalist, as well as pieces with multimedia and electroacoustic elements.

Life and career
Gity Razaz began her classical training at the age of seven, and graduated with bachelor's and master's degrees in music composition from The Juilliard School where she studied with John Corigliano, Samuel Adler, and Robert Beaser. She was the composer-in-residence at the inaugural season of National Sawdust from 2016 to 2017. Pulitzer Prize-winning composer John Corigliano has called her a "unique composer whose 'Middle-Eastern roots have merged with her Western sensibilities to produce music that is both original and startling. She is on her way to becoming a major force in contemporary music.'" Her music has been described by The New York Times as "ravishing and engulfing."

Razaz's music has been performed throughout the United States and internationally, including at Carnegie Hall, National Sawdust, The Jerome L. Greene Space at New York Public Radio, Ballet Moscow, Canada's National Ballet School, Amsterdam Cello Biennale, Pioneer Works, and Le Poisson Rouge, among others. Her first chamber opera, Fault Lines, was commissioned by the Washington National Opera and premiered at the Kennedy Center in 2018 and her Cadenza for the Once Young was featured on BBC Radio 3's programme In Tune.

The Seattle Symphony has presented her music on its concert "Music Beyond Borders: Music from the Seven" and included it in the inaugural season of Octave 9: Raisbeck Music Center. She also was a host for WQXR 93.9 FM New York's internet station Q2 Music, where she presented works of contemporary classical music.

Selected works

Solo
Legend of Sigh (2015) for cello, pre-recorded cello, and pre-recorded electronics
Shadow Lines (2014) for cello, pre-recorded cello, and pre-recorded electronics
Light (2014) for piano
Aleph (2012) for cello

Chamber
Four Haikus (2017) for guitar duo
A Prayer for the Abandoned (2015) for piano trio
The Strange Highway (2010) for cello octet
Duo (2007) for violin and piano

Orchestral
Salvador Dreams (2017) for orchestra
Arizona Dreams (2016) for string orchestra 
Concerto for violoncello and orchestra (2012)
Metamorphosis of Narcissus (2011) for chamber orchestra and electronics
In The Midst of Flux (2009) for orchestra
Concertino for Clarinet and Baroque Chamber Orchestra (2009)

Vocal
Fault Lines (2017), opera for four voices and chamber orchestra
The Call Across the Valley of Not-Knowing (2014-revised 2016) for soprano, baritone, cello, clarinet, and piano
Lux Aeterna (2016) for SATB a cappella
The Yellow Wallpaper Songs (2015) for soprano, violin, cello, and piano
Songs from the Book of Nightmares (2007) for soprano, oboe, clarinet, horn, and piano

Ballet
The Kreutzer Sonata (2017) for two violins, viola, cello, clarinet, and piano
Wave Ring (2014) for violin, cello, clarinet, piano, and pre-recorded electronics
Chance Has Spoken (2011) for vibraphone and string quartet

References

External links

1986 births
Living people
American women composers
American people of Iranian descent
21st-century American composers
21st-century American women